Injalak Arts (also known as Injalak Arts and Crafts) is a non-profit, community owned Aboriginal art centre located in Gunbalanya in West Arnhem Land in the Northern Territory of Australia. It was incorporated in 1989. It is known for artists working in a primarily figurative style, and continuing and developing the West Arnhem rock art tradition. It is also known for pandanus weavings. Artists are mostly Kunwinjku people; however, artists from many language groups across Arnhem Land are represented. While working within the continuous art history of the Arnhem region, Injalak Arts is part of the wider contemporary Aboriginal Art movement, which has made a large impact on the Australian and international art world.

History

Development of the market
The demand for art and artefacts from the Gunbalanya area began long before the incorporation of Injalak Arts and Crafts. Since early European contact, several notable collections were created and much informal trade took place. The anthropologist Baldwin Spencer visited Gunbalanya in 1912 in his role as Special Commissioner for Aboriginals and Chief Protector, staying with Paddy Cahill, the founder of the cattle station in Gunbalanya. He collected many bark paintings and fibre works, and Cahill continued to send him new works for the collection until around 1922. The American-Australian Scientific Expedition to Arnhem Land arrived in Gunbalanya in October 1948, and its leader Charles Mountford commissioned many paintings on bark. However, for him, as for Spencer, these were still ethnographic rather than art objects, a practice “comparable with that of our stone-age ancestors of Europe”. Both the year before and the year after the Mountford expedition, the area was visited by the anthropologists Ronald M. and Catherine H. Berndt of the Australian National Research Council, working for Professor A.P. Elkin of Sydney University. They too created a notable collection.

The market for Kunwinjku art began to expand from the late 1950s, largely thanks to major purchases by government institutions. The major collectors included Dorothy Bennett and Dr Scougall for the Art Gallery of New South Wales (1959-1966), the anthropologist Karel Kupka for the Basel Ethnographic Museum (1960), Australian Institute of Aboriginal Studies (1963), Musée national des Arts d'Afrique et d'Océanie (1963), and his private collection (now held at the National Gallery of Australia), as well as Helen Groger-Wurm for the Darwin Museum and the Australian Institute of Aboriginal Studies (1965–70).
  
From the 1962 to 1974, the Church Missionary Society (CMS) marketed the “art and crafts” of Arnhem Land, selling them through a dedicated outlet in Sydney. The fourth "classic" collection of art from Gunbalanya was gathered mostly through this source, by the Australian Aboriginal Arts Board. By the 1970s, visiting collectors and casual visitors also comprised a ready market for West Arnhem Land art.

Beginnings of Injalak Arts and Crafts
The history of Injalak Arts began with a screenprinting group started in 1986. In that year, a representative of the Duke of Edinburgh's Award scheme visited Gunbalanya with funding for people to participate. Wendy Kennedy, a teacher who came to Gunbalanya in 1974, had in 1983 accepted a position as adult educator in Gunbalanya. She and a group of her students decided on trying screenprinting for the 'hobby' element required by the award. The screenprinter Ray Young was hired to assist, and with the women sewing, they were soon producing printed fabric, bags, calico skirts, baby wraps, nappies and singlets. A number of the original participants in the Duke of Edinburgh's award, including Gabriel Maralngurra and Donna Nadjamerrek, are still involved in Injalak Arts to the present day, having become leaders within the organisation.

In 1988, the men of the group moved from the adult education centre to a shed near the community council office (the shed is now known as the old CDEP workshop). Around this time, the printers began moving away from generic figurative designs to designs influenced by the traditional style and subject matter of West Arnhem Land art. This raised the attention of elders and traditional custodians of the designs such as Lofty Bardayal Nadjamerrek. But while this could have led to conflict, it slowly developed into a system of cultural protocols around commercial painting still in play at Injalak today.

The screenprinting group caught the attention of the Commonwealth Government's Community Development program, which was keen to promote local business. In 1986–87, discussions and consultations were held about expanding the operations of the group to become an art centre trading a range of artistic media. This was in the context of the rapidly expanding Aboriginal Art movement at the time. In 1988, the screenprinting group successfully applied for $500,000 in funding from the Commonwealth Government, which led to the building of the Injalak Art Centre where is stands today. It was incorporated on 12 April 1989.

Development of the Art Centre

Art production picked up quickly following the creation of the new building. Screenprinting and sewing continued, and painting and weaving (primarily pandanus  weaving) increased dramatically. Wendy Kennedy stayed on until 1990, before handing over interim management to the screenprinter Ray Young. The first appointed manager, Felicity Wright, arrived in October 1991. Critical in the early days of the art centre was the senior painter Thompson Yulidjirri (d. 2009), who mentored the younger artists and developed Injalak as a place for the transmission of cultural knowledge outside the traditional venues. Felicity Wright stayed on as manager until 1995, a time which saw increasing recognition for Gunbalanya artists. Samuel Namundja won the National Aboriginal & Torres Strait Islander Art Award in the bark painting category in 1993. 
A series of managers between 1995 and 2001 included Andrew Headley, Matthew Johnson, Anthony Murphy and Paul Magin, until Anthony Murphy took up the position full-time again in January 2001. Anthony Murphy remained as manager until 2010. Lorna Martin arrived in August 2009 and remained as manager until December 2012. In December 2012 Injalak's first manager, Felicity Wright, returned and currently shares managerial responsibilities with Gabriel Maralngurra and Isaiah Nagurrgurrba (2014).

Cultural tourism

Since its inception, Injalak has been involved in cultural tourism, facilitating tours of nearby Injalak Hill. Injalak Hill is an important Aboriginal rock art site located just one kilometre from the art centre across the floodplain, or about a four kilometre drive via the main roads.

History of tourism at Injalak

Injalak artists have acted as guides of Injalak Hill since the opening of the art centre in 1989. Injalak Hill tours began as informal service, with tourists hiring artists as guides for rates often organised on the day. In 1992, a five-year plan for the art centre was formulated, with the Aboriginal governing body of Injalak expressing the desire to formally promote cultural tourism. The main reasons highlighted were to facilitate the understanding of Kunwinjku art and culture, and to generate work and income.
  
As demand increased, tourists began to book in advance, and eventually by the dry season of 2000, about 10-15 tours were leaving the art centre for Injalak Hill each week.

Artists

Current artists

Graham Badari
Gabriel Maralngurra
Glen Namundja
Ezariah Kelly
Joey Nganjmirra
Joe Guymala
Maath Maralngurra
Alicia Mardday
Anne Gumurdul
Isaiah Nagurrgurrba
Garry Djorlom
Don Namundja
Jill Nganjmirra
Lawrence Nganjmirra
Thommo Nganjmirra

Notable deceased artists associated with Injalak Arts

England Banggala
Peter Nabarlambal
Bardayal 'Lofty' Nadjamerrek
Jimmy Kalariya Namarnyilk
Bobby Nganjmirra
Robin Nganjmirra
Thompson Yulidjirri
Ganbaladj Nabegeyo
 Wanurr Bob Namundja

Media
Artists work within a range of media, prescribed by tradition and subsequent new media fostered by the art centre.
Bark painting in both ochres and acrylics
Paintings on Arches paper in both ochres and acrylics
Etchings
Woven, knotted and coiled works from pandanus, including baskets, mats, dilly bags and sculptural works
Knotted fibre bags, made from kurrajong bark and Livistona humilis palm leaves
Mako (Didgeridoos)
Items of traditional culture such as Clapsticks, spear throwers and spears 
Screen printed fabrics
Carvings, including Mimih Spirit carvings
Jewellery items such as earrings and necklaces, made using pandanus, seeds (commonly Adenanthera pavonina) and sometimes bones.

Access
 
The accessibility of Gunbalanya via road is determined by the level and flow of the East Alligator River. Cahill's Crossing, about 16 km from Gunbalanya, may be impassable during the wet season or towards high tide. In the dry season, from May to October, the road is generally passable, though visitors are advised to check tide times and consult with Kakaku National Park or the art centre. Depending on the year, the river is often also passable in April, November and early December.
 
Visitors are required to acquire a permit from the Northern Land Council in Jabiru or Darwin to enter Arnhem Land. For day visitors, these permits are generally issued on the spot. However the offices are closed on weekends so visitors may need to plan ahead. Occasionally weather conditions, ceremonial events or funerals may result in permits not being issued, so visitors are advised to contact the Northern Land Council in advance.

The turnoff to Cahill's Crossing is on the Arnhem Highway just before Jabiru. The road is tarred between the highway and Cahill's Crossing, and dirt between the crossing and just before Gunbalanya. The drive from Jabiru to the art centre takes around 60 minutes. Visitors are free to travel to the art centre via private vehicle, and there are also a range of tour companies which include Injalak Arts on their itinerary. Gunbalanya also has a sealed all-weather airstrip, Oenpelli Airport, and charter flights are available from Jabiru year-round. Gunbalanya Air Charters also provides transport between the airport and the town in both Gunbalanya and Jabiru.

References

Further reading

Aboriginal Arts Board of the Australia Council, Oenpelli Bark Painting, Ure Smith, 1979
Carroll, Peter John, Bark Art from Western Arnhem Land : Kunwinjku Dolobbo Bim, Bark Art from Injalak, Northern Territory Anglican Foundation for the Promotion of Aboriginal Art and Literature, 2010
Dyer, Christine Adrian (ed.), Kunwinjku Art from Injalak 1991-1992: The John W. Kluge Commission, Museum Art International, 1994
Hamby, Louise (ed.), Twined Together: Kunmadj Njalehnjaleken, Injalak Arts and Crafts, 2005
McLeod, Neil (ed.), Kunwinjku Spirit: Creation Stories from Western Arnhem Land, Melbourne University Press, 1997
Newstead, Adrian, The Dealer is the Devil: An Insider's History of the Aboriginal Art Trade, Brandl & Schlesinger, 2014
Taylor, Luke, Seeing the Inside: Bark Painting in Western Arnhem Land, Oxford University Press, 1996
Wright, Felicity, The Arts and Crafts Centre Story, Vol 1: a Survey of 39 Aboriginal Community Art and Craft Centres in Remote Australia Undertaken by Desart Inc, Aboriginal & Torres Strait Islander Commission, 1999
Wright, Felicity, The Arts and Crafts Centre Story, Vol 3: Good stories from out bush: Examples of best practice from Aboriginal art and craft centres in remote Australia, Aboriginal & Torres Strait Islander Commission, 2000

Further viewing

Cracking the Colour Code: A visual exploration of how we view colours, how we make them, and the meanings they hold in our world, dir. Hugh Piper, Electric Pictures and Gedeon Programmes, in assoc. SBS Television, Arte France et al., 2008.
Knowledge, Painting and Country, dir. Andrea & Peter Highlands, Creative Cowboy Films, 2011
Rock Art and Yingana: A walk up Injalak Hill, dir. Andrea & Peter Highlands, Creative Cowboy Films, 2011
The brush sings: Injalak – an aboriginal art centre, dir. Andrea & Peter Highlands, Creative Cowboy Films, 2011

External links
 

Australian art movements
Australian Aboriginal art
Australian artist groups and collectives
Artist cooperatives
Arnhem Land
Cooperatives in Australia